Gazzetta di Parma is a daily newspaper published in Parma, Italy. It is one of the oldest daily newspapers in the country.

History and profile
Gazzetta di Parma was established as a weekly newspaper in 1735. Cesare Zavattini started his career in the paper. Early contributors included Giovanni Guareschi, Giuseppe Verdi, Arturo Toscanini, Alberto Bevilacqua, Luca Goldoni and Leonardo Sciascia. The daily focuses on local news related to Parma.

The circulation of Gazzetta di Parma was 43,000 copies in 2007.

See also
 List of newspapers in Italy

References

External links
 

1735 establishments in Italy
Daily newspapers published in Italy
Italian-language newspapers
Mass media in Parma
Publications established in 1735
Weekly newspapers published in Italy